opened in Ōita, Ōita Prefecture, Japan, in 1987. The collection comprises materials relating to Ōita. The museum itself is on the site of the former , the provincial temple of Bungo province.

See also
 List of Cultural Properties of Japan - paintings (Ōita)
 Ōita Prefectural Museum of History

References

External links

  Ōita City Historical Museum

Museums in Ōita Prefecture
Museums established in 1987
1987 establishments in Japan
Ōita (city)
History museums in Japan